Neritilia succinea is a species of submarine cave snail, a marine gastropod mollusc in the family Neritiliidae.

Subspecies Neritilia succinea guatemalensis Pilsbry, 1920: synonym of Neritilia succinea (Récluz, 1841)

Description
The length of the shell attains 5 mm.

Distribution
This species fas found on the riverbank on the West Indian island of Dominica.; also off Guadeloupe.

References

 Rosenberg, G.; Moretzsohn, F.; García, E. F. (2009). Gastropoda (Mollusca) of the Gulf of Mexico, Pp. 579–699 in: Felder, D.L. and D.K. Camp (eds.), Gulf of Mexico–Origins, Waters, and Biota. Texas A&M Press, College Station, Texas
 Espinosa J., Ortea J. & Diez-García Y.L. (2017). El género Neritilia von Martens, 1879 (Mollusca: Gastropoda: Neritilidae) en Cuba, con la descripción de dos nuevas especies. Avicennia. 20: 49–52.
 Robart, G., Mandahl-Barth, G. & Ripert, C. (1977). Inventaire, repartition geographique et ecologie des mollusques dulcaquicoles d'Haiti (Caraibes). Haliotis. 8: 159–171.

External links
 Adams, C. B. (1845). Specierum novarum conchyliorum, in Jamaica repertorum, synopsis. Proceedings of the Boston Society of Natural History. 2: 1-17
 Pilsbry, H. A. (1920). Mollusca from Central America and Mexico. Proceedings of the Academy of Natural Sciences of Philadelphia. 71: 212-223, pl. 11

Neritiliidae
Gastropods described in 1841